Trebisonda "Ondina" Valla (20 May 1916 – 16 October 2006) was an Italian female athlete, and the first Italian woman to ever win an Olympic gold medal. She won it in the 80 m hurdles event at the 1936 Summer Olympics in Berlin, after establishing the new world record during the semi-final.

Biography
Born in Bologna, last after four brothers, she was named Trebisonda – a very unusual name for the country – after the Turkish town of Trabzon ( in Italian), which her father considered one of the most beautiful cities in the world. However, she was nicknamed Ondina, meaning "little wave".

Ondina Valla stood out for her personality and her sports talent even as a young girl. She rivalled with Claudia Testoni at the school championships in their hometown, and they would remain opponents for the rest of their careers. Aged 13, Ondina Valla was already considered one of Italy's top athletes. The following year she became national champion and was capped for the national team.

She was a versatile athlete, capable of excellent results in sprint events, hurdles races and jumps. She soon became a favorite with Italian sports fans. For the fascist government she was the ideal icon of the healthy, strong national youth. Media defined her "the sun in a smile".

Her most important achievement was the gold medal of 80 m hurdles race at the 1936 Summer Olympics in Berlin. On 5 August she won the semi-final in 11.6, a new world record. On the following day she ran the final. It was a tight race, with four athletes rushing together at the finish line. There were no doubts about Valla's victory, but a photofinish picture was needed to award the silver and bronze medals. Valla's lifelong rival, Claudia Testoni, finished fourth, without a medal. Valla and Testoni were also members of the Italian 4 × 100 m relay team which finished fourth.

The victory of Valla was important for the Fascist regime and the hostility of many leaders for the participation of women in athletic competitions started to decrease. Mussolini used the victory of the Italian athlete for propaganda, as a demonstration of the strength of the Italian race.

After those Olympic Games, Ondina Valla was forced to limit her competitions because of back problems. However, she still continued to compete until the early 1940s.

World record
80 metres hurdles: 11.6 ( Berlin, 5 August 1936)

Achievements

National titles
Ondina Valla has won the Italian Athletics Championships (individual), 16 times in various specialties.
1 win in 60 metres (1932)
2 wins in  100 metres (1933, 1936)
6 wins in  80 metres hurdles (1930, 1931, 1932, 1933, 1934, 1937)
1 win in  standing high jump (1930)
1 win in  pentathlon (1935)

See also
 Testoni–Valla rivalry
 Women's 80 metres hurdles world record progression
 Women's long jump Italian record progression
 Women's high jump Italian record progression
 Italy national relay team
 Legends of Italian sport - Walk of Fame
 FIDAL Hall of Fame

References

External links
 

1916 births
2006 deaths
Sportspeople from Bologna
Olympic athletes of Italy
Athletes (track and field) at the 1936 Summer Olympics
Italian female hurdlers
Italian female sprinters
Italian female high jumpers
Italian female long jumpers
Olympic gold medalists for Italy
Medalists at the 1936 Summer Olympics
Olympic gold medalists in athletics (track and field)
Women's World Games medalists
Italian Athletics Championships winners